Yann Perrin (born 1 August 1985 in Épinal) is a professional squash player who represented France. He reached a career-high world ranking of World No. 54 in June 2010.

References

External links
 
 

French male squash players
Living people
1985 births
Sportspeople from Épinal
20th-century French people
21st-century French people